Scopus Township is one of eight townships in Bollinger County, Missouri, USA. As of the 2000 U.S. Census, its population was 1,348. As of the 2010 U.S. Census, the population had increased to 1,518.

Scopus Township was originally called German Township; the original name was changed due to Anti-German sentiment during World War I.

Demographics
As of the 2010 U.S. Census, there were 1,518 people living in the township. There were 654 housing units in the township. The racial makeup of the township was 98.68% White, 0.46% Black or African American, 0.33% Native American, 0.26% Asian, and 0.26% from two or more races. Approximately 0.86% of the population were Hispanic or Latino of any race.

Geography

Incorporated Areas
The township contains no incorporated settlements.

Unincorporated Areas
The township contains the unincorporated area and historical community of Scopus.

Cemeteries
The township contains the following 15 cemeteries: Ates, Bess, Burton, Chostner, Coles, Cook, Hartle, Holt, James, Judge Long, Limbaugh, Mountain View, Pulliam, and Seabaugh.

Streams
The streams of Baker Branch, Big Blue Branch, Big Hollow Branch, Bollinger Branch, Cedar Branch, Cheek Creek, Cooks Branch, Fish Branch, German Branch, Hog Creek, James Creek, Little Muddy Creek, Little Whitewater Creek, Mayfield Creek, Panther Creek, Wolf Creek, and Yantz Branch flow through Scopus Township.

Landmarks
There are no known landmarks in the township.

Administrative Districts

School Districts
Meadow Heights R-II School District 
Woodland R-IV School District

Political Districts
Missouri's 8th Congressional District
State House District 145 
State Senate District 27

References

 USGS Geographic Names Information System (GNIS)

External links
 US-Counties.com
 City-Data.com

Townships in Bollinger County, Missouri
Cape Girardeau–Jackson metropolitan area
Townships in Missouri